Velušovce is a municipality in the Topoľčany District of the Nitra Region, Slovakia. In 2011 it had 506 inhabitants.

References

External links
http://en.e-obce.sk/obec/velusovce/velusovce.html
http://www.velusovce.sk.html

Villages and municipalities in Topoľčany District